Jamie Yates (born 24 December 1988) is an English footballer who is Assistant Manager/player for Sheffield F.C.

Career
He signed a new one-year contract with Rotherham in May 2008.

In January 2009, Yates joined Conference National club Burton Albion initially on a month's loan, which was subsequently extended to the end of the season. He scored his first goal for Burton in a 1–0 win away to Grays Athletic in only his second game for the club, a match which also set a new Conference record of twelve consecutive wins.

In 2015 Jamie Yates was appointed Head Coach of Matlock Town youth system, which saw him develop and see several players go into the Professional and Semi Professional game. In 2019 Yates left Matlock Town and was appointed Player coach of current club Sheffield F.C. a role which involves working closely with the club's youth system in Partnership with Leeds United. In January 2022 Yates returned to his first Football Club Rotherham United  as Football Development officer, a role which involves being Lead Coach of the clubs development sides whilst continuing his Player Coach role with Sheffield FC. On 1st July 2022 He was officially appointed as Assistant Manager of Sheffield F.C. after helping keep the club in the Northern Premier League East the previous season working with Manager Ryan Cresswell.

References

External links

English footballers
Footballers from Sheffield
1988 births
Living people
English Football League players
National League (English football) players
Rotherham United F.C. players
Burton Albion F.C. players
Kettering Town F.C. players
Alfreton Town F.C. players
Boston United F.C. players
Gainsborough Trinity F.C. players
North Ferriby United A.F.C. players
Matlock Town F.C. players
Association football midfielders